KRFS (1600 AM) is a radio station licensed to Superior, Nebraska, United States. The station airs an adult contemporary format and is currently owned by CK Broadcasting, Inc.

References

External links
KRFS's website

RFS
Mainstream adult contemporary radio stations in the United States